The International Journal of Cardiology is a peer-reviewed medical journal that publishes research articles about the study and management of cardiac diseases. The journal is affiliated with the International Society for Adult Congenital Cardiac Disease.

Abstracting and indexing 
The journal is abstracted and indexed in MEDLINE, Science Citation Index, Current Contents, EMBASE, and Scopus. According to the Journal Citation Reports, the journal had a 2020 impact factor of 4.164.

References

External links 
 

Cardiology journals
Elsevier academic journals
Biweekly journals
English-language journals
Publications established in 1981